When Chai Met Toast is a multilingual indie-folk alternative band formed in Kochi in 2016. The band's lineup comprises lead vocalist Ashwin Gopakumar, guitarist Achyuth Jaigopal, keyboardist Palee Francis, and drummer Pai Sailesh. The band is known for their happy and lighthearted music which they create in English and Hindi, sometimes featuring Tamil and Malayalam lyrics.

Having released two EPs and several singles, the band has been recognized as a rising artist in Spotify’s RADAR program. The video of their single Break Free was chosen as one of VH1 India's top 50 hit videos. They have also developed the tracks for comedian Kenny Sebastian’s 2018 web series Die Trying.

When Chai Met Toast frequently performs at live events and music festivals in India, including Bacardi NH7 Weekender, SulaFest, OnePlus Music festival and Red Bull Tour Bus. In August 2021, their music was featured in the trailer of Farhan Akhtar’s upcoming Bollywood film Jee Le Zaraa.

Band members 

Ashwin Gopakumar – Vocals
 Achyuth Jaigopal –  Guitar and Banjo
 Palee Francis – Keyboard and producer
 Pai Sailesh – Drums

History

Early years 
When Chai Met Toast was originally formed in 2014 by Ashwin and Achytuth, both of whom were independently working on their own music slightly different in genre. Ashwin had made his debut as a playback singer with Home in the movie Jacobinte Swargarajyam, and Payye Veeshum in the movie Aanandam while Achyuth had created his debut track Sound of Memory for the movie Humans of Someone.  The duo met at Springr, a music café in Fort Kochi, when Achyuth asked Ashwin to do the vocals for his music. They decided to collaborate and named themselves When Chai Met Toast, to represent the Indian and Western influences in their music. They were soon joined by a friend Ricky on keyboard, who along with Ashwin left the country to study further later. At this time, When Chai Met Toast was on hiatus, Achyuth joined and toured with Raghu Dixit who is the frontman for the Raghu Dixit Project, a multilingual folk music band as their lead guitarist. In 2016, Achyuth and Ashwin returned to Kochi and were joined by Palee and Sailesh to form the new and current version of When Chai Met Toast. The first single they released was Firefly in 2016.

Discography

References

External links
 

Indian rock music groups
Indian folk music groups
Culture of Kochi